Purpurea, purple in Latin, may refer to:
 8585 Purpurea, an asteroid
 Purple heron, Ardea purpurea
 Echinacea purpurea, the eastern purple coneflower or purple coneflower
 Ulmus 'Purpurea', an elm cultivar
 Sarracenia purpurea, the purple pitcher plant
 Claviceps purpurea, an ergot fungus

See also 
 Purpureum (disambiguation)
 Purpura (disambiguation)